Tom J. Quinn was the UK's first Professor of cardiac nursing, and is a Fellow of the Royal College of Nursing (RCN) for his outstanding contribution to research and practice of cardiac nursing.

He currently works at the Kingston University covering research, development and consultancy in cardiovascular care issues, particularly emergency and critical cardiac care and policy. He was previously Professor of Cardiac Nursing at Coventry University. His NHS experience over almost three decades included periods at St Bartholomew's Hospital, the National Heart Hospital and York Hospital and at regional office, Strategic Health Authority, the Department of Health and NHS Modernisation Agency, and the ambulance service. He is clinical lead in the National Library for Health covering the cardiovascular, stroke and vascular specialist libraries.

He was instrumental in developing and writing the Department of Health's National Service Framework on heart disease and is a fellow of the European Society of Cardiology.

He has also published more than 60 papers focusing on the care of patients with cardiac disease or developing nursing practice.

References

English nurses
Year of birth missing (living people)
Living people
Academics of Coventry University
Male nurses
Cardiovascular researchers
Academics of the University of Surrey